Kilia  (minor planet designation: 470 Kilia) (1901 GJ) is a 27 km main-belt asteroid discovered on 21 April 1901 by Luigi Carnera at Heidelberg. It potentially takes 290 hours to rotate.

History
Kilia was discovered on 21 April 1901 by Luigi Carnera, the 470th asteroid discovered. It was one of the 16 asteroid discoveries made by Carnera.

References

External links
 
 

Background asteroids
Kilia
Kilia
Slow rotating minor planets
S-type asteroids (Tholen)
S-type asteroids (SMASS)
19010421